The UCI Track Cycling World Championships – Women's scratch is the women's world championship scratch race event held annually at the UCI Track Cycling World Championships. The event was first introduced in 2002. Kirsten wild of the Netherlands and Yumari González of Cuba have won the title three times and two cyclists have won the title on two occasions: Olga Sliusareva of Russia, and Katarzyna Pawłowska of Poland.

Medalists

Medal table

External links
Track Cycling World Championships 2016–1893 bikecult.com
World Championship, Track, Scratch, Elite cyclingarchives.com

 
Women's scratch
Lists of UCI Track Cycling World Championships medalists